Podbrzezie Dolne  is a village in the administrative district of Gmina Kożuchów, within Nowa Sól County, Lubusz Voivodeship, in western Poland.

The village has a population of 457.

External links 
 Jewish Community in Podbrzezie Dolne on Virtual Shtetl

References

Podbrzezie Dolne